Trubny is a rural locality (a settlement) in Aktyubinsky Selsoviet of Volodarsky District, Astrakhan Oblast, Russia. The population was 715 as of 2010. There are 11 streets.

Geography 
Trubny is located 3 km south of Volodarsky (the district's administrative centre) by road. Volodarsky is the nearest rural locality.

References 

Rural localities in Volodarsky District, Astrakhan Oblast